Batina is a rural locality (a village) in Yorgvinskoye Rural Settlement, Kudymkarsky District, Perm Krai, Russia. The population was 102 as of 2010. There are 3 streets.

Geography 
Batina is located 17 km northeast of Kudymkar (the district's administrative centre) by road. Systerova is the nearest rural locality.

References 

Rural localities in Kudymkarsky District